The 1976 Akron Zips football team was an American football team that represented the University of Akron during the 1976 NCAA Division II football season. In their fourth season under head coach Jim Dennison, the Zips compiled a 10–3 record and outscored all opponents by a combined total of 282 to 144.  In post-season play, they defeated UNLV, 27–6, in a Division II quarterfinal, and defeated , 29–26, in the Knute Rockne Bowl. In the championship game in Wichita Falls, Texas, Akron lost to Montana State in the Pioneer Bowl. The 1976 season was the first and only ten-win season in Akron's program history.

Schedule

References

Akron
Akron Zips football seasons
Akron Zips football